Antonin Trilles (born 20 July 1983 in Arles) is a French goalkeeper.

Career 
Trilles played previously for French clubs US Marignane, GFC Ajaccio and AC Arles-Avignon, before signed in February 2011 for S.League club Etoile FC.

References

1983 births
Living people
French footballers
Marignane Gignac Côte Bleue FC players
Expatriate footballers in Singapore
AC Arlésien players
French expatriate sportspeople in Thailand
Expatriate footballers in Thailand
French expatriate sportspeople in Singapore
Antonin Trilles
French expatriate footballers
Gazélec Ajaccio players
Association football goalkeepers
Étoile FC players
People from Arles
People from Bouches-du-Rhône
Footballers from Provence-Alpes-Côte d'Azur